The Ordre des administrateurs agréés du Québec (English: Chartered Administrators Order of Quebec) (Adm.A.) is a professional Order mandated by the Government of Quebec (Canada) to regulate the practice of the "Administrateurs agréés" (English: Chartered Administrators).

Under article 37i of the Quebec Professional Code, Adm.A. may exercise the following professional activities: participate in the establishment, management and management of public bodies or enterprises, determine or remake their structures as well as coordinate and control their production or distribution methods and their economic or financial policies and provide advisory services in these matters.

The head office of the "Ordre des administrateurs agréés du Québec" is located in Montreal.

Titles Adm.A., CMC and Pl.Fin.

The Professional Code of Quebec provides that the "Administrateurs agréés" (Chartered Administrators) shall practice a profession in a reserved capacity in Quebec. Only the "Administrateurs agréés" registered on the Ordre board are permitted to use the title of "Administrateur Agréé" (Adm.A.) or "Certified Management Consultant" (cmc) if they hold a valid license to this end. The OAAQ also administers the title of "Financial Planner" (Pl.Fin.) for its members who are the bearer, under an agreement between the OAAQ and the AMF (Autorité des marchés financiers).

Mission 

Based on Professional Code of Quebec, the primary mission of OAAQ is to protect the public by regulating the professional practice of their members. The "Ordre des Administrateurs agréés du Québec" promotes innovation and achievement of a higher level of competence for professionals in the administration so that they contribute proactively and dynamically to the development of companies and organizations.

Vision 
According to its vision statement, the OAAQ stands out as the benchmark for all professional managers who believe in responsible management practice in Quebec.

Professional practice 
The OAAQ exercises its mission through activities that aim to improve the deontology and ethics of its members, in particular by:
 oversight of professional practice, by various committees including professional inspection, discipline and arbitration of accounts;
 professional development, through the sharing of expertise, in particular training, mentoring, conferences, publication of articles or books, networking activities and the posting of administrative positions in the market;
 information to the public on the professional practice of its members.

The activities of the OAAQ are increasingly oriented towards social media, in particular through its website.

Fundamental principles and functions of Good Management 

The professional practice models of Adm.A. are articulated around the fundamental principles and functions of good management. Good management is generally perceived as management as a "good father" or as a "reasonable and prudent person", and is enriched by principles that take into account the current tools and contexts of the administration.

The six fundamental principles of the sound management of the "Ordre des administrateurs agréés du Québec" are the basis of the profession of certified administrator:

6.Self-denial: An Adm.A. must put the interests of the client before his own interests, those of his business or his employer. An Adm.A. must respect the fields of expertise of other professionals advising the client (financial planner, cpa, notary, lawyer, etc.) and intermediaries assigned to the file. Faced with opportunities related to his business relationship, an Adm.A. should avoid placing themselves in a conflict of interest.

Competencies linked to the administration 

In addition, an Adm.A. professional practice is based on sound management, which is divided into five competencies linked to the administration:

Major areas of activities: Managerial and patrimonial 

The "Ordre des administrateurs agréés du Québec" (the Order of the ADMA) is a group of managers or advisors from all walks of life. Adm.A. members are distinguished in various areas of management, ethics and governance. These professionals work in a multitude of fields of professional activities which are grouped in the following two spheres:

The multidisciplinary nature of the "Administrateurs agréés" confers on the "Ordre des Administrateurs agrees" a real center of expertise for management issues, which increasingly complex. The Adm.A. members are gathered to share their knowledge and experiences, to find solutions to management issues and problems, to put forward some lines of thought. This synergy helps to advance the profession through innovation and to development.

The Adm.A. contribute objectively and competently to the progress and leadership of the administrative sciences.

Title "Financial Planner" (Pl.Fin.)

Since 1991, the OAAQ is regulating the designation "Financial Planner" (F.P.) worn by its members who graduated from the Institut québécois de planification financière (English: Institute of Financial Planning of Quebec) (IQPF) which provides the basic training leading to the title.

Under the aegis of the OAAQ, the P.F. (Pl.Fin.) membership reached about 650 members in 2002-2003. Until December 2002, the OAAQ administered in Quebec the title of "RFP-Registered Financial Planner" to which the Adm.A. Pl.Fin. could qualify; this title was issued by the "Canadian Association of Financial Planners" (CAFP), which merged with CAIFA (Canadian Association of insurance and Financial Advisor) in 2003 to become Advocis.

In 2004, following extensive studies and consultations, the OAAQ repositioned the generally accepted practice model of Adm.A. Pl.Fin. to the patrimonial administration. This expanded practice model covers the roles of administering the property of others and supporting roles related to patrimonial administration.

The "Financial Planning Competency Charter" was designed in 1998 by the OAAQ and was updated in 2001. This charter describes the professional skills required to practice as a "Financial Planner" within the OAAQ. In 2004, the OAAQ launched the first edition of the book "Guide des meilleures pratiques en gestion de patrimoine privé" (translation: "Guide to Best Practices in Private Wealth Management"). In June 2008, publisher CCH, in partnership with the OAAQ, published the second edition of the book entitled "Gestion de patrimoine privé - Guide des meilleures pratiques" (translation: "Private Wealth Management - Best Practice Guide") (741 pages).

Title "Certified Management Consultant" (CMC)

Since 1994, the Order of ADMA has applied to supervise, develop and promote the profession of Certified Management Consultant (CMC) in Quebec. By February 2014, this designation was recognized in 50 countries. This designation is administered by CMC Canada and internationally by the "International Council of Management Consulting Institutes".

The CMC title is the only recognized management title in the world. This designation aims at high standards of professional management skills, in particular through advanced training and by instructing the professional on the various aspects of the managerial administration.

In Quebec, at first instance, the holders of the CMC title apply the OAAQ code of ethics. In addition, the CMC-Canada uniform Canada-wide code of ethics is respected by all CMAs. in Canada; it contains provisions relating to integrity, objectivity, transparency, competence, conflicts of interest, invoicing, quality of services, etc. CMC-Canada has also developed a Common Knowledge and Competency Charter (CBK) that includes all the knowledge and skills required to practice the profession of management consultant. This charter is explained in the book "Management Consulting: An Introduction to the Methodologies, Tools and Techniques of the Profession", which is offered free to new members C.M.C. CMC-Canada is planning soon to release more elaborate volumes covering six functional areas (financial management, human resources management, information technology management, marketing management, operations management and strategic management).

The "Canadian Charter of Competencies" covers nine areas:
1. Appreciate the company's situation, challenges and opportunities;
2. Assist clients in developing strategies for improvement;
3. Help clients implement a recommendation;
4. Carry out an advisory mission;
5. Demonstrate interpersonal skills;
6. Demonstrate personal skills;
7. Demonstrate ethical behavior;
8. Demonstrates functional competence;
9. Demonstrate a global vision of management.

Administration of the condominium 
Many members Adm.A. have developed special expertise to practice their professional practice in this condominium management which constitutes a collective heritage. This domain integrates the patrimonial administration of the collective heritage and the managerial management of the operations of the co-ownership. The OAAQ is particularly involved in the supervision of this field of activities through information, training and instrumentation. The OAAQ is a partner of McGill University for the certificate program in co-ownership: Certificate of professional development in condominium management.

A website on condominium management was launched on June 16, 2015. Under the auspices of the Chambre des notaires du Québec (Chamber of Notaries of Quebec), at the request of the "Quebec Department of Justice", this site is a follow-up to one of the recommendations contained in the "Report of the Advisory Committee on Co-ownership (2013)" on the large-scale dissemination of quality information on condominium law.

This portal on co-ownership brings together the expertise of self-regulatory organizations (notably the "Ordre des administrateurs agréés du Québec") whose members play a significant role in this field. This site provides useful information for developers, unions, buyers and sellers.

Co-ownership information site developed in partnership with the OAAQ

History

Regulations 

In their professional activities, the Adm.A. are regulated in particular by:
 The Professional Code of Quebec,
 The Code of Ethics of the OAAQ (c. C-26, r.14.1, updated in 2004, 2011 and 2013). This Code determines, in particular, acts derogating from the dignity of the profession, provisions intended to preserve the confidentiality of information of a confidential nature that comes to the knowledge of the member of the OAAQ in the practice of his profession, Exercise of the rights of access and rectification provided for in sections 60.5 and 60.6 of the Professional Code of Quebec and the conditions, obligations and prohibitions with respect to advertising by a member of the OAAQ.

Other regulations governing the OAAQ and its members are:

External links 
  Ordre des administrateurs agréés du Québec (OAAQ)
 Conseil interprofessionnel du Québec (CIQ)
  Office des professions du Québec (OPQ)
 Web site of "Certified Management Consultant" (CMC) of Canada
 Web site of "Institut québécois de planification financière" (IQPF) (Financial Planning Institute of Quebec)
  Educative web site on condominium and the participation of Professionals

See also

Office des professions du Québec (OPQ)
Conseil Interprofessionnel du Québec (CIQ)
Professional Code of Quebec

References

Professional associations based in Canada
Organizations based in Montreal